Piłsudski (feminine: Piłsudska, plural: Piłsudscy) is a Polish surname. Notable people with the surname include:

Adam Piłsudski (1869-1935), Polish politician
Bronisław Piłsudski (1866–1918) Polish ethnographer
Jan Piłsudski (1876-1950), Polish politician, lawyer
Józef Piłsudski (1867–1935), Polish politician, military leader, marshal and Chief of State

Polish-language surnames